Katrina Max Forrester (born 1986) is a British political theorist and historian. She is an assistant professor of government and social studies at Harvard University with research interests in twentieth-century social and political theory, particularly in the history of liberalism, US and British postwar intellectual history, theories of work and feminism. Her In the Shadow of Justice: Postwar Liberalism and the Remaking of Political Philosophy won a number of academic awards. She has written on a variety of topics for the London Review of Books, The New Yorker, Dissent, N+1, Harper's and The Guardian, amongst others.

Early life and education
Forrester was born in 1986 to parents Lisa Appignanesi and John P. Forrester. Her mother is an author and her father was a professor in the department of history and philosophy of science at the University of Cambridge. While completing her PhD at the University of Cambridge, she also held a research fellowship at St John's College, Cambridge, and received the Dan David Prize Scholarship.

Career
Upon completing her fellowship, Forrester accepted a permanent lectureship at Queen Mary University of London until 2017 when she joined the faculty at Harvard University. During the 2017–18 academic year, she co-edited Nature, Action and the Future: Political Thought and the Environment with Sophie Smith. Forrester held a Kluge Fellowship at the Library of Congress from 2019 to 2020 and was selected to deliver the Quentin Skinner Lecture at Cambridge in 2021.

Forrester's book In the Shadow of Justice: Postwar Liberalism and the Remaking of Political Philosophy received the Organization of American Historians' Merle Curti Award, the Society for US Intellectual History's Book Award, and was shortlisted for the Royal Historical Society's Gladstone Prize 2020. She later co-edited a special section of Dissent with Moira Weigel.

Personal life
Forrester married Jamie Robert Martin in 2019.

References

External links
 

Living people
1986 births
21st-century English women writers
English political scientists
British women historians
21st-century English historians
Harvard University faculty
Alumni of the University of Cambridge
Women political scientists